Miho Fujii (Japanese 藤井 美穂, ふじい みほ), is a Japanese actress, comedian, and model.

Career 
Fujii was born in Mie Prefecture of Japan.

During high school, she was involved in a local theatre company. After graduating high school, she went to the Toho Gakuen College of Drama and Music. Fujii was inspired to travel abroad and went to a language and drama school in Los Angeles, and appeared in comedy shows.

After that, Fujii became a plus-size model, one of the few Asian plus-size models with the opportunity to appear in movies and television as an actress.

References

External links 
 
 Cosmopolitan Interview

People from Mie Prefecture
Japanese models
Japanese comedians
Japanese feminists
Year of birth missing (living people)
Living people